The red-bearded bee-eater (Nyctyornis amictus) is a large species of bee-eater found in southern Myanmar, the Thai-Malay Peninsula, Borneo, Sumatra and nearby smaller islands. This species is found in openings in patches of dense forest.

Description 

Like other bee-eaters, they are colourful birds with long tails, long decurved beaks and pointed wings. They are large bee-eaters, predominantly green, with a red colouration to face that extends on to the slightly hanging throat feathers to form the “beard”. Their eyes are orange.

Diet 
Like other bee-eaters, they predominantly eat  insects, especially bees, wasps and  hornets, which are caught in flight from perches concealed in foliage. They hunt alone or in pairs, rather than in flocks, and sit motionless for long periods before pursuing their prey.

Behaviour 
Like other bee-eaters, they nest in burrows tunnelled into the side of sandy banks, but do not form colonies.

References

 The Hamlyn photographic guide to birds of the world, foreword by Christopher Perrins; general editor: Andrew Gosler, London : Hamlyn, 1991, 

red-bearded bee-eater
Birds of Malesia
red-bearded bee-eater